Amir Tahmouresi (born April 8, 1991) is an Iranian footballer who plays for Rah Ahan  in the Iran's Premier Football League.

Club career
Tahmouresi started his career with Bargh Shiraz. In summer 2011 he joined Rah Ahan by the coach, Ali Daei.

Club Career Statistics
Last Update  11 May 2012

References
Amir Tahmouresi at Persianleague.com

1991 births
Living people
Bargh Shiraz players
Rah Ahan players
Iranian footballers
Association football central defenders